This is a list of techniques used in word play.

Techniques that involve the phonetic values of words
 Engrish
 Chinglish
 Homonym: words with same sounds and same spellings but with different meanings
 Homograph: words with same spellings but with different meanings
 Homophone: words with same sounds but with different meanings
 Homophonic translation
 Mondegreen: a mishearing (usually unintentional) as a homophone or near-homophone that has as a result acquired a new meaning. The term is often used to refer specifically to mishearings of song lyrics (cf. soramimi).
 Onomatopoeia: a word or a grouping of words that imitates the sound it is describing
 Phonetic reversal
 Rhyme: a repetition of identical or similar sounds in two or more different words
 Alliteration: matching consonants sounds at the beginning of words
 Assonance: matching vowel sounds
 Consonance: matching consonant sounds
 Holorime: a rhyme that encompasses an entire line or phrase
 Spoonerism: a switch of two sounds in two different words (cf. sananmuunnos)
 Same-sounding words or phrases, fully or approximately homophonous (sometimes also referred to as "oronyms")

Techniques that involve the letters

 Acronym: abbreviations formed by combining the initial components in a phrase or names
Apronym: an acronym that is also  a phrase pertaining to the original meaning
 RAS syndrome: repetition of a word by using it both as a word alone and as a part of the acronym
 Recursive acronym: an acronym that has the acronym itself as one of its components
 Acrostic: a writing in which the first letter, syllable, or word of each line can be put together to spell out another message
 Mesostic: a writing in which a vertical phrase intersects lines of horizontal text
 Word square: a series of letters arranged in the form of a square that can be read both vertically and horizontally
 Backronym: a phrase back-formed by treating a word that is originally not an initialism or acronym as one
 Replacement Backronym: a phrase back-formed from an existing initialism or acronym that is originally an abbreviation with another meaning
 Anagram: rearranging the letters of a word or phrase to produce a new word or phrase
 Ambigram: a word which can be read just as well mirrored or upside down
 Blanagram: rearranging the letters of a word or phrase and substituting one single letter to produce a new word or phrase
 Letter bank: using the letters from a certain word or phrase as many times as wanted to produce a new word or phrase
 Jumble: a kind of word game in which the solution of a puzzle is its anagram
 Chronogram: a phrase or sentence in which some letters can be interpreted as numerals and rearranged to stand for a particular date
 Gramogram: a word or sentence in which the names of the letters or numerals are used to represent the word
 Lipogram: a writing in which certain letter is missing
 Univocalic: a type of poetry that uses only one vowel
 Palindrome: a word or phrase that reads the same in either direction
 Pangram: a sentence which uses every letter of the alphabet at least once
 Tautogram: a phrase or sentence in which every word starts with the same letter
 Caesar shift: moving all the letters in a word or sentence some fixed number of positions down the alphabet

Techniques that involve semantics and the choosing of words

 Anglish: a writing using exclusively words of Germanic origin
 Auto-antonym: a word that contains opposite meanings
 Autogram: a sentence that provide an inventory of its own characters
 Irony
 Malapropism: incorrect usage of a word by substituting a similar-sounding word with different meaning
 Neologism: creating new words
 Phono-semantic matching: camouflaged/pun borrowing in which a foreign word is matched with a phonetically and semantically similar pre-existent native word (related to folk etymology)
 Portmanteau: a new word that fuses two words or morphemes
 Retronym: creating a new word to denote an old object or concept whose original name has come to be used for something else
 Oxymoron: a combination of two contradictory terms
Zeugma and Syllepsis: the use of a single phrase in two ways simultaneously
 Pun: deliberately mixing two similar-sounding words
 Slang: the use of informal words or expressions

Techniques that involve the manipulation of the entire sentence or passage

 Dog Latin
 Language game: a system of manipulating spoken words to render them incomprehensible to the untrained ear
 Pig Latin
 Ubbi dubbi
 Non sequiturs: a conclusion or statement that does not logically follow from the previous argument or statement

Techniques that involve the formation of a name

 Ananym: a name with reversed letters of an existing name
 Aptronym: a name that aptly represents a person or character
 Charactonym: a name which suggests the personality traits of a fictional character
 Eponym: applying a person's name to a place
 Pseudonym: an artificial fictitious name, used as an alternative to one's legal name
 Sobriquet: a popularized nickname

Techniques that involves figure of speech
 Conversion (word formation): a transformation of a word of one word class into another word class
 Dysphemism: intentionally using a word or phrase with a harsher tone over one with a more polite tone
 Euphemism: intentionally using a word or phrase with a more polite tone over one with a harsher tone
 Kenning: circumlocution used in Old Norse and Icelandic poetry
 Paraprosdokian: a sentence whose latter part is surprising or unexpected in a way that causes the reader or listener to reframe the first

Others

 Aleatory
 Bushism
 Constrained writing
 Rebus
 Interlanguages, Mixed languages and Macaronic languages
 Sarcasm
 Tmesis

See also
 Figure of speech
 Logology
 Word game
 Word play
 Wit

List